The Gin Ganga (Gin River), is a  long river situated in Galle District of Sri Lanka. 

The river's headwaters are located in the Gongala Mountain range, near Deniyaya, bordering the Sinharaja Forest Reserve. The river flows past the villages of Baddegama, Nagoda, Thelikada and Hegoda. The Wakwella Bridge, which was the longest bridge in Sri Lanka, is built over this river. The river is also dammed at Thelikada. The mouth of the river is at Gintota, just north of Galle, where it flows into the Indian Ocean.

See also 
 List of rivers in Sri Lanka
 Wakwella Bridge

References

Rivers of Sri Lanka